The Shore is a Northern Irish short film directed by Terry George. The film won the 2012 Academy Award for Best Live Action Short Film. It was filmed entirely at George's family cottage at Coney Island near Ardglass, County Down, Northern Ireland.

The film follows two boyhood best friends who are reunited after a 25-year division created by a misunderstanding from the days of the Northern Ireland Troubles.

References

External links

Irish short films
2011 films
Live Action Short Film Academy Award winners
Films directed by Terry George
Films about The Troubles (Northern Ireland)
Films scored by David Holmes (musician)
2010s English-language films